Douglas Allen Collins (born August 16, 1966) is an American lawyer and retired politician who served as the U.S. representative for Georgia's 9th congressional district from 2013 to 2021. 

A member of the Republican Party and a political supporter of former U.S. president Donald Trump, he previously served in the Georgia House of Representatives from 2007, representing the 27th district, which includes portions of Hall County, Lumpkin County, and White County. Collins also serves as a chaplain in the U.S. Air Force Reserve with the rank of colonel.

Collins ran for Georgia's Class III U.S. Senate seat in 2020 and finished in third place behind Democrat Raphael Warnock and incumbent Republican Kelly Loeffler in the state's nonpartisan blanket primary, failing to make it to the top-two runoff. Collins had opted out of a House re-election bid to run for the Senate and was succeeded there by Andrew Clyde. In April 2021, Collins stated he would not be running in Georgia's 2022 gubernatorial election or concurrent Senate election. Since leaving politics, he has served as a legal counsel for Trump.

Early life and education
Born in Gainesville, Georgia, Collins is a graduate of North Hall High School. He attended North Georgia College & State University, where he received a Bachelor of Arts in political science and Criminal law in 1988. He attended the New Orleans Baptist Theological Seminary, receiving his Master of Divinity (M.Div.) in 1996. Collins also earned his Juris Doctor from Atlanta's John Marshall Law School in 2007.

Career 
Collins worked as an intern for Georgia U.S. representative Ed Jenkins before working as a salesman, selling hazardous material safety products to Georgia's state and local governments. From 1994 to 2005, Collins was a senior pastor at Chicopee Baptist Church while co-owning a retail scrapbooking store with his wife, Lisa. Collins worked as a lawyer and has been a managing partner at the Collins and Csider law firm since 2010.

Military service
In the late 1980s, Collins served two years in the United States Navy as a navy chaplain. After the September 11 attacks, Collins joined the United States Air Force Reserve Command, where he presently serves as a chaplain (lieutenant colonel). As a member of the 94th Airlift Wing at Dobbins Air Reserve Base in Marietta, Georgia, Collins was deployed to Balad Air Base for five months in 2008 during the Iraq War.

Georgia House of Representatives

Elections
Collins served three terms in the Georgia House of Representatives, representing Georgia's 27th district from 2007 to 2013. After Republican incumbent state representative Stacey Reece decided he would run for the Georgia State Senate, Collins announced he would run for the vacated seat. He won both the primary and general elections unopposed. He was unopposed for reelection in 2008 and 2010.

Tenure
In 2011, Collins sponsored a plan proposed by Georgia governor Nathan Deal to reform Georgia's HOPE Scholarship program. The bill allowed for a 10% cut in scholarships and raised the level of SAT test scores and GPA required to obtain a scholarship, saving the state $300 million. Collins argued that the program would be insolvent without the cut, saying that "If you look at it at the end of the day, Georgia still leads the way in providing hope—educational hope—for those wanting to go on to post-secondary education." In 2012, he supported amending Georgia's constitution to establish a statewide commission authorizing and expanding charter schools.

Collins supports the death penalty and voted for allowing juries to use the death penalty without a unanimous verdict if the defendant committed at least one "statutory aggravating circumstance." He is against physician-assisted suicide, voting in favor of making it a felony for anyone who "knowingly and willingly" assists someone in a suicide. Collins voted for the failed Pre-Abortion Ultrasound Requirement, requiring doctors to give women who are undergoing an abortion the option of a free ultrasound, or to listen to the fetal heartbeat. He also voted in favor of Georgia's law to prohibit abortions past the 20th week, being one of the most restrictive early abortion bans in the country.

In 2012, Collins signed a pledge sponsored by Americans for Prosperity promising to vote against any global warming-related legislation that would raise taxes.

Collins supported President Donald Trump's 2017 executive order to impose a temporary ban on entry to the U.S. for citizens of seven Muslim-majority countries. He stated that "The executive order allows re-entry to lawful permanent residents and does not represent a comprehensive ban on entry to people from certain countries. In this temporary measure, President Trump has given us the opportunity to get refugee policy right going forward."

Committee assignments
In the 2011–2012 legislative session, Collins was one of three administrative floor leaders for Georgia governor Nathan Deal. Collins served on the committees for:
 House Appropriations (Secretary)
 Judiciary Non-Civil
 Public Safety & Homeland Security
 Health & Human Services
 Defense and Veterans Affairs

U.S. House of Representatives

2012 election

In 2012, Collins ran for Congress in the redrawn 9th congressional district. The district's incumbent, Tom Graves, opted instead to run in the newly created 14th district, which had absorbed his home in Ranger. Collins faced local media personality Martha Zoller and retired principal Roger Fitzpatrick in the Republican primary. The 9th was the most Republican district in the Eastern Time Zone, with a Cook Partisan Voting Index of R+27. As a result, whoever won the Republican primary would almost certainly be the district's next representative in Congress.

Collins finished first in the primary with 42 percent of the total, but just 700 votes ahead of Zoller. Because neither had a majority, a runoff was held on August 21, 2012, and Collins defeated Zoller in that contest 55 percent to 45 percent. In the general election, Collins defeated Democrat Jody Cooley 76 percent to 24 percent.

2018 election

After running unopposed in the 2016 election, Collins faced Democratic challenger Josh McCall in the 2018 election. Collins overwhelmingly defeated McCall with 79.6% of the vote, compared to McCall's 20.4%.

Committee assignments

 United States House Committee on Rules
 United States House Committee on the Judiciary
 Subcommittee on Courts, Intellectual Property and the Internet
 Subcommittee on Regulatory Reform, Commercial and Antitrust Law
 Committee on Oversight and Government Reform
 Subcommittee on Federal Workforce, U.S. Postal Service and the Census
 Subcommittee on Economic Growth, Job Creation and Regulatory Affairs

Caucus memberships
 U.S.-Japan Caucus

2020 U.S. Senate election 

In January 2020, Collins announced his candidacy for the United States Senate. He ran in the special election held in November 2020 to complete the final two years of the term of retiring senator Johnny Isakson, who stepped down on December 31, 2019, citing health issues. Collins faced incumbent senator Kelly Loeffler, a Republican appointed by Georgia governor Brian Kemp to fill the seat until a special election was held. President Trump had supported Collins as a replacement for Isakson.

Collins faced some initial resistance to his candidacy from senior Senate Republicans as well as from the Senate Leadership Fund (a political action committee aligned with Majority Leader Mitch McConnell) and from the National Republican Senatorial Committee, both of which backed Loeffler. Per Georgia election law, all candidates for that Senate seat (regardless of political party) competed in a nonpartisan blanket primary. If no candidate successfully earned over 50% of the vote, the top two finishers would participate in a runoff election in January 2021.

After both Collins, who finished third in the primary, and Trump lost their respective races in Georgia, they made claims about fraud in the Georgia elections. Georgia's Republican secretary of state Brad Raffensperger called Collins a "liar" and "charlatan" for his statements. Collins endorsed Loeffler in the runoff election following his primary defeat.

Political positions

Abortion
Collins opposes abortion. Hours after Supreme Court justice Ruth Bader Ginsburg died in September 2020, Collins wrote on Twitter: "RIP to the more than 30 million innocent babies that have been murdered during the decades that Ruth Bader Ginsburg defended pro-abortion laws. With @realDonaldTrump nominating a replacement that values human life, generations of unborn children have a chance to live."

Health care
Collins supports repealing the Affordable Care Act, also known as Obamacare. He called it an "experiment [that] has continued to fail America" and "costly for my neighbors". Collins said the passage of the Tax Cuts and Jobs Act of 2017 would not result in anyone losing health coverage.

Donald Trump
Collins has been described as an "ardent Trump ally." He strongly defended Trump during his impeachment inquiry over the Trump-Ukraine scandal. During his bid for the Georgia Senate seat in 2020, Collins campaigned with Roger Stone, a Trump associate and convicted criminal whose sentence Trump commuted earlier in 2020. Among the two major Republican contenders for the 2020–21 United States Senate special election in Georgia, Kelly Loeffler and Collins tried to distinguish themselves by claiming to be the most "pro-Trump."

Collins did not publicly comment on sexual misconduct accusations against Donald Trump in the wake of the Access Hollywood tape being released.

In December 2020, Collins was one of 126 Republican members of the House of Representatives who signed an amicus brief in support of Texas v. Pennsylvania, a lawsuit filed at the United States Supreme Court contesting the results of the 2020 presidential election, in which Joe Biden prevailed over incumbent Donald Trump. The Supreme Court declined to hear the case on the basis that Texas lacked standing under Article III of the Constitution to challenge the results of the election held by another state.

House speaker Nancy Pelosi issued a statement that called signing the amicus brief an act of "election subversion." Additionally, Pelosi reprimanded Collins and the other House members who supported the lawsuit: "The 126 Republican Members that signed onto this lawsuit brought dishonor to the House. Instead of upholding their oath to support and defend the Constitution, they chose to subvert the Constitution and undermine public trust in our sacred democratic institutions."

Environment
Collins rejects the scientific consensus on climate change.

Election interference
In his opening statement of Robert Mueller's testimony to Congress on July 24, 2019, Rep. Collins stated, "We will need to... ensure that government intelligence and law enforcement powers are never again used and turned on a private citizen or a political candidate as a result of the political leanings... If we carry anything away today it must be that we increase our vigilance against foreign election interference while we ensure our government officials don't weaponize their power against the constitutional rights guaranteed to every US citizen." Individuals called to testify in impeachment hearings suggested that Trump held up delivery of Congressionally legislated aid to Ukraine in order to pressure Ukraine to investigate his political rival. On October 31, 2019, Rep. Collins stated, and repeated on other occasions, that the impeachment hearings enacted to investigate Trump's use of his authority to pressure a foreign government to investigate his political rival, were a "sham".

Tax reform
Collins voted in favor of the Tax Cuts and Jobs Act of 2017. He said the bill would encourage businesses to create more jobs and that the economy and communities would strengthen. He said, "We're making the IRS less ravenous and putting more money back in the hands of American families so that they can pursue more of their ambitions on their own terms."

Interest group ratings
Collins has an "A" rating from the National Rifle Association Political Victory Fund.

Collins has an "F" rating from the National Organization for the Reform of Marijuana Laws (NORML) for his voting history regarding cannabis-related causes.

The American Conservative Union gave him a 100% in 2012 (Georgia State legislature) and a 91% evaluation in 2017.

LGBT rights
Collins opposes same-sex marriage. In 2015, he said, "I strongly support a constitutional amendment defining marriage between one man and one woman." He co-sponsored the Marriage and Religious Freedom Act and the State Marriage Defense Act.

Collins also opposes the Equality Act, a bill that would expand the federal Civil Rights Act of 1964 to ban discrimination based on sexual orientation and gender identity. He voted against the bill in 2019.

Collins has written letters in defense of military chaplain Wes Modder, whom the Navy attempted to fire after he had allegedly berated students at the Naval Nuclear Power Training Command (where he was posted) who had gone to him for counseling. Modder allegedly made anti-gay comments and berated students for engaging in premarital sex.

Foreign policy
In the aftermath of the January 2020 killing of Iranian general Qasem Soleimani, Congressman Collins said during an interview on Lou Dobbs Tonight that Democrats were "in love with terrorists" and "mourn Soleimani more than they mourn our Gold Star families who are the ones who suffered under Soleimani." Democratic responses were quick, with Senator Tammy Duckworth, an Iraq War veteran who lost both legs in combat, responding, "I left parts of my body behind fighting terrorists in Iraq. I don't need to justify myself to anyone." After first defending his claims on Fox News, Collins apologized on Twitter, saying, "Let me be clear: I do not believe Democrats are in love with terrorists, and I apologize for what I said earlier this week."

Women's rights
Collins voted against the 2013 Violence Against Women Act because it sought to expand the original law to cover same-sex couples and allow battered foreigners residing in the country illegally to claim temporary visas, also known as U visas.

Personal life
Collins married his wife, Lisa Jordan, in 1988. She is a retired fifth grade teacher at Mount Vernon Elementary School in Gainesville, Georgia, where the couple resides with their three children, Jordan, Copelan and Cameron, one of whom has spina bifida. Collins is a practicing Southern Baptist, and attends Lakewood Baptist Church.

References

External links

 
 
 
 

|-

|-

|-

|-

1966 births
21st-century American politicians
Atlanta's John Marshall Law School alumni
Candidates in the 2020 United States Senate elections
Donald Trump litigation
Living people
Republican Party members of the Georgia House of Representatives
Military personnel from Georgia (U.S. state)
Republican Party members of the United States House of Representatives from Georgia (U.S. state)
United States Air Force chaplains
United States Air Force reservists
United States Navy chaplains